Pyrausta virginalis is a species of moth in the family Crambidae. It is found in southern Europe, Turkey, Armenia and Afghanistan.

The wingspan is about 16 mm.

References

Moths described in 1832
virginalis
Moths of Europe
Moths of Asia